Cross Mountain is a census-designated place (CDP) in Bexar County, Texas, United States. The population was 3,944 at the 2020 census, up from 3,124 at the 2010 census. It is part of the San Antonio Metropolitan Statistical Area.

Geography
Cross Mountain is located in northwestern Bexar County. It is bordered by the city of San Antonio to the east and the CDP of Scenic Oaks to the north.

Demographics

As of the 2020 United States census, there were 3,944 people, 909 households, and 812 families residing in the CDP.

As of the census of 2000, there were 1,524 people, 529 households, and 464 families residing in the CDP. The population density was 207.6 people per square mile (80.2/km2). There were 555 housing units at an average density of 75.6/sq mi (29.2/km2). The racial makeup of the CDP was 90.88% White, 2.62% African American, 0.52% Native American, 1.44% Asian, 3.28% from other races, and 1.25% from two or more races. Hispanic or Latino of any race were 18.50% of the population.

There were 529 households, out of which 38.4% had children under the age of 18 living with them, 78.6% were married couples living together, 6.6% had a female householder with no husband present, and 12.1% were non-families. 9.3% of all households were made up of individuals, and 3.4% had someone living alone who was 65 years of age or older. The average household size was 2.85 and the average family size was 3.00.

In the CDP, the population was spread out, with 25.3% under the age of 18, 4.9% from 18 to 24, 25.6% from 25 to 44, 32.9% from 45 to 64, and 11.4% who were 65 years of age or older. The median age was 42 years. For every 100 females, there were 100.5 males. For every 100 females age 18 and over, there were 104.1 males.

The median income for a household in the CDP was $102,628, and the median income for a family was $104,744. Males had a median income of $64,821 versus $37,228 for females. The per capita income for the CDP was $40,549. About 2.2% of families and 3.8% of the population were below the poverty line, including 5.1% of those under age 18 and none of those age 65 or over.

Education
Cross Mountain is served by the Northside Independent School District.

Students are zoned to:
 Ellison Elementary School and Leon Springs Elementary School 
 Hector Garcia Middle School (San Antonio) 
 Louis D. Brandeis High School

References

Census-designated places in Bexar County, Texas
Census-designated places in Texas
Greater San Antonio